Mattias Lindgren (born 30 March 1972) is a Swedish rower. He competed in the men's double sculls event at the 1992 Summer Olympics.

References

1972 births
Living people
Swedish male rowers
Olympic rowers of Sweden
Rowers at the 1992 Summer Olympics
People from Dalarna